The discography of Japanese pop duo Dreams Come True consists of 20 studio albums, 6 compilation albums, 17 video albums, and numerous singles. The band was formed in 1988 by Miwa Yoshida, Masato Nakamura, and Takahiro Nishikawa as Cha-Cha & Audrey's Project, which was later changed to Dreams Come True. The first single "Anata ni Aitakute" did not chart, but their eponymous debut album sold over a million copies in Japan and was certified Million by the Recording Industry Association of Japan (RIAJ). The follow up albums also performed well on the charts, with the 1989 release Love Goes On... lingering on the Oricon Albums Chart for four years. The group's fifth studio album The Swinging Star (1992) was at one point, the best-selling album in Japan, shifting over 3.7 million copies in the country.

In 1993, the band debuted the single "Winter Song", recorded in English, which was used as a theme song of the Japanese release of the film Sleepless in Seattle (1993). The single "Love Love Love" (1995), topped the Oricon Singles Chart and sold over two-million copies, being certified two-times million by the RIAJ. In the late 1990s, the band recorded English version of a few of their songs, which were included in the international edition of Sing or Die (1998). However, the album did not chart in the United States. The band's 2001 release Monkey Girl Odyssey topped the chart in Japan, but the sales had dropped. In 2002, Takahiro quit the band in 2002 and Toshiba EMI also dropped the group. The single "It's All About Love" (2002) was released through the band's own label, DCT Records, before being picked up by Universal J. Following another English release, the band released Diamond 15 (2004), which peaked at number 2 on the Oricon Albums Chart. The 2008 single "Tsuretette Tsuretette" topped the Oricon Singles Chart, and the parent album Do You Dreams Come True? (2009) was certified three-times platinum by the RIAJ. The band has sold about 50 million records worldwide.

Albums

Japanese studio albums

English studio albums

Compilation albums

Remix albums

Limited edition albums

Music box albums

Soundtrack albums

Singles

As lead artists

As collaborating artists

Promotional singles

Other charted songs

Other appearances

Videography

Video albums

Music videos

Notes

References

disco
Discographies of Japanese artists
Pop music group discographies